Independent politicians, who contest elections without the support of one of the political parties, have played a continuous role in the politics of Ireland since independence in 1922.

Provision for independents in electoral law
If a candidate is not the candidate of a registered political party, they may be nominated for elections to Dáil Éireann with the assent of 30 electors in the constituency, for elections to the European Parliament with the assent of 60 electors in the constituency, and for local elections with the assent of 15 electors in the local electoral area. They may choose to have the designation non-party next to their name on the ballot paper.

In Seanad elections and presidential elections, candidates are not nominated by parties directly, and party labels do not appear on the ballot.

Independents supporting governments
In the case of minority governments, where the party or parties forming the government do not have a majority in the Dáil, they will usually be dependent on independent TDs in votes of confidence. This can be by In the Inter-Party Government led by John A. Costello as Taoiseach, James Dillon served as Minister for Agriculture. He was an independent TD, having left Fine Gael in 1942 because he disagreed with the policy of neutrality during the Second World War. He rejoined Fine Gael in 1953 and became leader in 1959.

In 2009, Mary Harney continued as Minister for Health as an independent member of the government after the dissolution of the Progressive Democrats, and served until 2011.

After the 2016 general election, 3 independent TDs were appointed to a minority Fine Gael–Independent government on 6 May 2016: Denis Naughten as Minister for Communications, Climate Action and Environment, Shane Ross as Minister for Transport, Tourism and Sport, and Katherine Zappone as Minister for Children and Youth Affairs. Ross is a member of the Independent Alliance, and other members of the Independent Alliance were appointed as Ministers of State. Naughten resigned as minister on 11 October 2018. Ross and Zappone served until the appointment of a new government on 27 June 2020.

Local government
At the 2019 local elections, independents won 185 of the 949 seats on city and county councils.

European Parliament
Luke 'Ming' Flanagan has been an MEP for Midlands–North-West since 2014.

President of Ireland
The current President of Ireland Michael D. Higgins was elected in 2011 having been nominated by Labour Party members of the Oireachtas, but re-elected in 2018 on his own nomination.

Election results

General elections
Key for government column:

References

Further reading